The Arizona State League was a minor league baseball league that existed from 1920 to 1930. The league start was in 1920 but teams and format are not known until the 1923 playing season. After the 1927 season. the league made application to the National Association of Professional Baseball Clubs and were approved to begin play in 1928 as a Class D-level league, and consisted of teams based in Arizona and Texas, evolving into the Arizona–Texas League in 1931.

History
Previous to the formation of the minor league, the "Arizona State League" operated as a semi–professional league beginning in 1920.

The Arizona State League began play as a four–team Class D level minor league in the 1928 season, with all four charter franchises based in Arizona. The first Arizona State League President was Paul Davis. The league charter members were the Bisbee Bees of Bisbee, Arizona, Miami Miners of Miami, Arizona, Phoenix Senators of Phoenix, Arizona, and Tucson Cowboys of Tucson, Arizona. The same four franchises played for the duration of the Arizona State League. The league was formed in February 1927, with Dr. John E. Bacon as their first president, with the four franchises and a team salary cap of $2,400. Major League baseball Commissioner Kenesaw Mountain Landis was involved in awarding Bisbee its first professional minor league team, gaining his support after earlier Bisbee semi–pro teams had refused to sign players involved in the 1919 Black Sox Scandal.

In their first season of play in 1928, the Arizona State League played a regular season without playoffs. The Phoenix Senators were the 1928 Arizona State League Champions finishing with a 39–29 record, 2.0 games ahead of the 2nd place Bisbee Bees (37–31). They were followed by the Miami Miners (30–38) and Tucson Cowboys (30–38).

The 1929 Arizona State League, with Fred Joyce becoming league president, became a six–team league adding the Globe Bears and Mesa Jewels as expansion franchises. The Mesa franchise withdrew from the league on July 24, 1929 and Mesa's remaining opponents were given 3 wins and 1 loss, as the remaining five teams finished the season. The Miami Miners won the first half title and Bisbee won the second half, as the league began playing a split season schedule in 1929, with two champions meeting in the Finals. The Bisbee Bees (60–30) had the best overall record. The Miami Miners (50–40), Globe Bears (48–42), Tucson Cowboys (43–47), Phoenix Senators (40–49), and Mesa Jewels (28–61) rounded out the 1929 final standings. The Mesa Jewels had actually folded on July 24, 1929 with an 18–25 record on that date. For the remainder of the season, Mesa's scheduled opponents were given a record 3 wins and 1 loss for each scheduled series with the disbanded team. In the 1929 Finals, the Miami Miners defeated the Bisbee Bees 4 games to 3 to win the championship.

Miami was declared the winner of the seventh game of the 1929 Finals after a league meeting. The seventh game ended in the darkness with Bisbee ahead 14–13 in the 9th inning as thousands of Miami fans were on the field and throwing cushions. The game was stopped at that point and declared a “no contest” by league president Fred Joyce. Both teams appealed Joyce’s decision. At a league meeting on October 27, 1929 Miami was awarded the title in a 2-to-1 vote by the other three teams.

In 1930, their final season of play, Wilford S. Sullinger became the Arizona State League president. The El Paso Texans of El Paso, Texas, joined the six–team league, replacing the Mesa Jewels. At a league meeting on February 2, 1930, following a presentation, El Paso was awarded a franchise (over the Arizona cities of Mesa, Jerome, Clarksdale, Nogales and Douglas), even though the nearest team was Bisbee at 284 miles and Phoenix was 430 miles. The 1930 Arizona State League was split into two half-seasons. Phoenix and Globe tied for the 1st half title and Bisbee won the second half title. The overall standings were led by Bisbee (60–45), followed by the El Paso Texans (58–47), Phoenix Senators (58–47), Globe Bears (56–49), Tucson Cowboys (45–60) and Miami Miners (38–67). In a Playoff, Globe defeated Phoenix 3 games to 0 for the first half title. In the 1930 Arizona State League Finals, Bisbee and Globe were tied at 3 games each when Bisbee won on a forfeit after Globe refused to play in Bisbee on September 17, 1930.

In the 1930 Finals, with the teams tied 3 games each, controversy ensued. After Globe and Bisbee could not agree on a location for the seventh game, league president Wilfred Sullinger ruled the game would be played in Bisbee. In response, Globe president Al Floyd, citing finances in traveling to Bisbee, offered to play the game at a neutral site or to have the location decided by a coin flip. Sullinger reinforced that the seventh game was to be played in Bisbee and that Bisbee would be the league champion should Globe not play the game. Bisbee president C.T. Knapp noted the series had total revenues over $4,000 and Bisbee offered to pay half of the Globe travel expenses to Bisbee. Floyd and Globe ultimately refused to travel to play in Bisbee and the Bisbee Bees were declared the champions by forfeit.

After the 1930 season, the Arizona State League, with the continued addition of the El Paso franchise, changed their name and evolved into the 1931 Class D level Arizona–Texas League, with Wilford S. Sullinger remaining as president of the newly named league. The Bisbee Bees, El Paso Texans, Globe Bears, Phoenix Senators and Tucson Missions continued play in 1931, joined by the Nogales Internationals.

Arizona State League teams

Standings & statistics
1928 Arizona State League

1929 Arizona State League

Playoffs: Miami defeated Bisbee 4 games to 3. Finals: Miami defeated the Bisbee Bees 4 games to 3. (Game 7 decided by league vote).

1930 Arizona State League
Globe and Phoenix tied for the 1st half title. Bisbee won the 2nd half title. Playoff: Globe defeated Phoenix 3 games to 0 for the first half title. Finals: Bisbee 3 games, Globe 3 games. Bisbee won on a forfeit when Globe refused to play in Bisbee on September 17.

References

Defunct minor baseball leagues in the United States
Baseball leagues in Arizona
Baseball leagues in Texas
Defunct professional sports leagues in the United States
Sports leagues established in 1928
Sports leagues disestablished in 1930